Tam Iao San (born 25 October 1976) is a football coach, currently managing Monte Carlo.

Playing career
Tam moved to Macau aged seven. At club level, Tam played for Lam Pak, Artilheiros, Monte Carlo and Heng Tai.

Internationally, Tam made seven appearances for Macau.

Managerial career
Following his retirement, Tam returned to former club Monte Carlo as manager. From 2015 to 2017, Tam managed Macau. Ahead of the 2019 Liga de Elite season, Tam returned as manager of Monte Carlo.

References

1976 births
Living people
Macau footballers
Macau football managers
C.D. Monte Carlo players
G.D. Lam Pak players
Macau international footballers
Macau national football team managers
Association football midfielders